The 8th Legislative Assembly of Quebec was the provincial legislature in Quebec, Canada that existed from March 8, 1892, to March 6, 1897. The Quebec Conservative Party was the governing party for the last time in Quebec. Charles Boucher de Boucherville was the Premier for much of 1892; Louis-Olivier Taillon ran the province for most of the mandate until he was replaced by Edmund James Flynn during the final year. The Conservatives would remain the opposition party until 1935, when they merged with the Union Nationale which won the elections held the following year.

Seats per political party
 After the 1892 elections

Member list

This was the list of members of the Legislative Assembly of Quebec that were elected in the 1892 election:

Other elected MLAs
Other MLAs were elected in this mandate during by-elections

 Élie-Hercule Bisson, Quebec Liberal Party, Beauharnois, June 7, 1892 
 Louis-Felix Pinault, Quebec Liberal Party, Matane, November 3, 1892 
 Charles McClary, Quebec Conservative Party, Compton, October 19, 1894 
 François-Xavier Lemieux, Quebec Liberal Party, Bonaventure, December 11, 1894 
 James John Guerin, Quebec Liberal Party, Montréal division no.6, October 22, 1895 
 Albert William Atwater, Quebec Conservative Party, Montréal division no.4, June 4, 1896 
 Édouard Bouffard, Quebec Conservative Party, Montmorency, June 23, 1896

Cabinet Ministers

De Boucherville Cabinet (1892)
 Prime Minister and Executive Council President: Charles-Eugène Boucher de Boucherville
 Agriculture and Colonization: Louis Beaubien
 Public Works: Guillaume-Alphonse Nantel 
 Crown Lands: Edmund James Flynn
 Attorney General: Thomas Chase Casgrain (1892), Edmund Jamess Flynn (1892)
 Provincial secretary: Louis-Philippe Pelletier
 Treasurer: John Smythe Hall (1892), Charles-Eugène Boucher de Boucherville (1892)
 Members without portfolios: Louis-Olivier Taillon, John McIntosh

Taillon Cabinet (1892-1896)

 Prime Minister: Louis-Olivier Taillon
 Executive Council President: Louis-Olivier Taillon (1892-1895), Michael Felix Hackett (1895-1896)
 Agriculture and Colonization: Louis Beaubien
 Public Works: Guillaume-Alphonse Nantel 
 Crown Lands: Edmund James Flynn
 Attorney General:Edmund Jamess Flynn (1892), Thomas Chase Casgrain (1892-1896)
 Provincial secretary: Louis-Philippe Pelletier
 Treasurer: Louis-Olivier Taillon (1892, 1894-1896), John Smythe Hall (1892-1894)
 Members without portfolios: Thomas Chapais (1893-1896), John McIntosh (1893-1896), Alexander Webb Morris (1895-1896)

Flynn Cabinet (1896-1897)

 Prime Minister: Edmund James Flynn
 Executive Council President: Thomas Chapais
 Agriculture and Colonization: Louis Beaubien (1896-1897)
 Agriculture: Louis Beaubien (1897)
 Colonization and Mines: Thomas Chapais (1897)
 Public Works: Edmund James Flynn
 Crown Lands: Guillaume-Alphonse Nantel (1896-1897)
 Lands, Forests and Fishing: Guillaume-Alphonse Nantel (1897)
 Attorney General:Louis-Philippe Pelletier
 Provincial secretary: Michael Felix Hackett
 Treasurer: Albert William Atwater

New electoral districts
The electoral map was slightly modified in 1895 with the creation of the Îles-de-la-Madeleine district, which was formed from parts of Gaspé and includes the Magdalen Islands.

References

External links
1892 election results
List of Historical Cabinet Ministers

008